First Captain may refer to:
 Senior Captain or First Captain, a rank of various armies
 Captain of the Fleet or First Captain, chief-of-staff to an admiral in charge of a fleet in the Royal Navy
 First Captain, the title given to the senior ranking cadet, the Brigade Commander, of the United States Military Academy or Virginia Military Institute, which is organized as a brigade, see United States Military Academy#Rank and organization

See also
 Captain (armed forces)
 Captain (disambiguation)
 Second Captain (disambiguation)